Resilience is a 2006 American drama/thriller film.  It was written and directed by Paul Bojack, and starred Henry LeBlanc, Al Rossi, Julie Alexander, Steve Wilcox, and Amy Arce. Resilience garnered strong reviews from The New York Times, Variety, and Film Threat.  The Library of the Academy of Motion Picture Arts and Sciences acquired the screenplay for its permanent core collection.

Cast
Henry LeBlanc
Al Rossi
Julie Alexander
Steve Wilcox
Amy Arce
Eric Cadora
Kristen Davidson
Ron E. Dickinson
Jake Eberle
Stephen Full
Alejandro Furth
Kevin Goulet
Jennifer Jalene
Tom Kiesche
Jayne Amelia Larson

References

2006 films
2006 thriller drama films
2006 drama films
2000s English-language films